"Forever" is a song recorded by Dutch record producer Martin Garrix and Russian production duo Matisse & Sadko. It was released via Garrix's Netherlands-based record label Stmpd Rcrds, and exclusively licensed to Epic Amsterdam, a division of Sony Music, on 20 October 2017. It is the fourth collaboration between Martin Garrix and Matisse & Sadko, after "Dragon", "Break Through the Silence", and "Together".

Background 
Garrix and Matisse & Sadko premiered together the song at Shanghai Ultra China festival on 9 September 2017, accompanied by posting a ten-second snippet of the song on Snapchat, which was recorded during his performance. The official teaser of the song was posted by the label on Twitter two days before the release. The song was officially released one week after the Garrix's collaboration as GRX with Brooks, on the song "Boomerang", and one day before Garrix knows if he keeps his first place in the DJ Mag Top 100.

Critical reception 
Dancing Astronaut staff called "Forever" a melodical house collaboration. Kat Bein from Billboard wrote that the song starts with "heart-aching chords on a church organ" and "heavy drums echo in over uplifting guitar". In the same way she noted that the wordless vocal improves moving vibes. According to the redaction of Catalan radio Flaix FM, the intro reminds Garrix's previous song, "Pizza" but they noticed that "Pizza" has a more melodic and epic beginning. However, they indicated that there are in these two songs "the both themes, instrumental with a very similar musical structure", which is apparent to a "progressive big room genre".

Music video
The official music video of the song was released at the same day through Martin Garrix's YouTube channel. It was directed, shot and edited by Damian Karsznia, accompanied by production assistants Joris Hoevenberg and Mees Roozen. Shot in Scotland, it shows the road trip of Sjak van Hoof, a biker on a motorcycle. He crosses roads close to mountains and valleys, as on the cover of the single, in order to forget his loneliness.

Charts

Notes

References

Martin Garrix songs
2017 singles
Songs written by Martin Garrix
Instrumentals
2017 songs
Progressive house songs
Stmpd Rcrds singles